Keren Ugle (born 7 July 1979) is an Australian rules footballer who played for the Fremantle Dockers. He was drafted from South Fremantle in the WAFL as the 5th selection in the 2001 AFL Rookie Draft. He played four games for Fremantle in 2001, mainly as a forward before being delisted at the end of the season. He then returned to WAFL and played for South Fremantle, playing a total of 175 games, including in South's 2005 WAFL premiership winning side.

Ugle's younger brothers Dane and Liam also played in the WAFL, and all three played cricket together at the Sydney Cricket Ground in an all indigenous team.

References

External links

1979 births
Fremantle Football Club players
South Fremantle Football Club players
Indigenous Australian players of Australian rules football
Living people
Australian rules footballers from Western Australia